Vicky Jones (born 1978) is an English actress, stage director playwright and screenwriter, who is the co-artistic director of DryWrite Theatre Company, along with her frequent collaborator Phoebe Waller-Bridge.

Early life
Jones was born in Sheffield, South Yorkshire, England.  She attended the University of Birmingham, studying international politics.

Career
While working as a director, Jones met Phoebe Waller-Bridge and became friends while working on theatre productions. The two founded and became co-artistic directors of DryWrite Theatre Company. In 2013, Jones directed Waller-Bridge's stage production, Fleabag, which premiered at the Edinburgh Festival Fringe. Fleabag was later adapted as a television series for BBC and Amazon Prime Video. Jones wrote the episode Don't I Know You? for Killing Eve in 2018.

Jones wrote the series Run for HBO in 2020 starring Merritt Weaver and Domhnall Gleeson.

References

Jones
Living people
English theatre directors
20th-century English writers
English women writers
Alumni of the University of Birmingham
20th-century English women
20th-century English people